Pitamakan Lake is located in Glacier National Park, in the U. S. state of Montana. Pitamakan Pass is just south of the lake and the Lake of the Seven Winds is to the northwest.

See also
List of lakes in Glacier County, Montana

References

Lakes of Glacier National Park (U.S.)
Lakes of Glacier County, Montana